Job Durupt (15 February 1931 – 15 March 2017) was a French politician. He was the mayor of Tomblaine from 1971 to 2001. He served as a Socialist member of the National Assembly from 1981 to 1988, representing Meurthe-et-Moselle. He became an officer of the Legion of Honour in 2016.

References

1931 births
2017 deaths
Politicians from Nancy, France
Socialist Party (France) politicians
Deputies of the 7th National Assembly of the French Fifth Republic
Deputies of the 8th National Assembly of the French Fifth Republic
Mayors of places in Grand Est
Officiers of the Légion d'honneur